The 505th Knightly Motorized brigade (505. Viteška Motorizovana brigada) was part of the 5th Corps under the command of Brigadier General Izet Nanić. The 505th Knightly Motorized brigade was honored by the late president of Bosnia and Herzegovina, Alija Izetbegović, as the most elite brigade during the Bosnian War because of its many victories.

The 505th Knightly Motorized brigade was commanded by Izet Nanić from its creation to his death in 1995. Throughout the Bosnian war the 505th brigade liberated about 300 km2 of Bosnian territory from the Republika Srpska.

History 
The brigade was formed on 15 August 1992, and it was first called the "105 Bužim Krajina Infantry Brigade", but it was changed on 1 April to the 505th Brigade. On the day of the formation, the brigade had 97 officers, 140 non-commissioned officers and 1,452 soldiers, with one-third of them being armed with infantry or hunting weapons. On 14 December, by decision of the presidency, the brigade was received the title "Knightly". The first war experience of the brigade was on 21 April 1992, where Serb soldiers attacked Bosanska Krupa with the goal to seize it. They didn't manage to complete their objective, but the lack of weapons and ammunition forced the units to cross to the left bank of the Una River where positions were consolidated and established, and the aggressors' advance in the direction of Cazin and Bužim was stopped. The first great victory of the brigade was in Munja '93, where 360 poorly armed fighters from the brigade fought against a well fortified and well armed brigade from the Army of Republika Srpska and won. 163 Serb soldiers were killed in the battle and several hundred were wounded, while only 18 from the 505th Brigade were killed.

The commander of the brigade, Izet Nanić, was killed in the Siege of Bihać during Operation Storm on 5 August 1995. He was posthumously awarded the Order of the Golden Lily, and the Order of Hero of the Liberation War.

Significant actions and successes 

 Operation Munja '93
 Operation Tiger '94
 Operation Breza '94
 Operation Sana '95

Losses 
The 505th Buzim Brigade had 462 killed, 2,514 wounded and 189 missing / captured fighters and elders.

Reorganized Units
The brigade was reorganized, and these units were added:
1. Detachment TO Bužim
2. Detachment TO Bužim
3. Detachment TO Bužim
Special Forces Unit "Hamze"
Special Forces Unit "Gazije"
Independent Units from the Detachment TO Bužim

References

Bejdo Felić: 5th Corps 1992-1995
Dr. N. Thomas & K. Mikulan - The Yugoslav Wars 2

Brigades of the Army of the Republic of Bosnia and Herzegovina